Elmhurst Ballet School is an independent school for professional classical ballet in the United Kingdom. It takes students aged 11–19 years who intend to pursue a career in professional classical ballet. Elmhurst provides a full academic day in conjunction with a full vocational course in ballet and dance training."

History
One of the earliest vocational dance schools in the United Kingdom, Elmhurst was established in 1923 in Camberley, Surrey, by Mrs Helen Ida Mortimer in the grounds of the Prep School run by Miss Violet Crisp. The school moved to purpose-built premises in Edgbaston, Birmingham in 2004. There is also a medical centre and a physiotherapy/exercise centre. In addition to day students, there is on-site boarding accommodation for up to 121 resident students and off-site boarding for 30 sixth-formers.

Robert Parker, a former Birmingham Royal Ballet principal dancer, has been Artistic Director since 2012.

Current and Former Staff
Mary Goodhew, former Artistic Director
Robert Parker, Artistic Director
Pamela Motley Verrall, music teacher
Jessica Wheeler, Principal

Notable alumni

Jenny Agutter
Melissa Hamilton
Helen Baxendale
Hetty Baynes
Sarah Brightman
Tracey Childs
Thomas Forster
Fiona Fullerton
Imogen Hassall
Jacqueline Chan
Caroline Langrishe
Tanja Liedtke
Jennie Linden
Deborah Makepeace
Hayley Mills
Juliet Mills
Pamela Franklin
Dame Merle Park
Polly Parsons
Prunella Ransome
Paul James Rooney
Hermione Norris
Jane Slaughter
Tessa Wyatt
Lorna Yabsley

References

External links

Mary Goodhew: The making of a dancer at Birmingham Royal Ballet
Inspection report, June 2011 at Ofsted
Description of the reredos from the school chapel in Camberley, and the founder of the ballet school, Mrs Helen Mortimer, and her famous Christmas play.

Private schools in Birmingham, West Midlands
Dance schools in the United Kingdom
Ballet schools in the United Kingdom
Performing arts education in the United Kingdom
Performing arts in Birmingham, West Midlands
Edgbaston